Rachael Margaret Grinham (born 22 January 1977 in Toowoomba, Queensland) is an Australian professional squash player. She won the World Open in 2007, and the British Open in 2003, 2004, 2007 and 2009. She reached the World No. 1 ranking in August 2004 and held it for 16 consecutive months.

Career

Early years
Rachael has a great pedigree as a squash player. Winner of the World Junior title in 1993 aged 16, she had an opportunity to defend in 1995, but was beaten by Jade Wilson from New Zealand in the final. Around that time she was also part of the Australian Institute of Sport squad. Since joining the WISPA World Tour during 1994, her array of strokes and strong temperament initially took her steadily towards the top 20, a barrier she finally breached in the middle of 1997. She won her first tournament in 1998 when she was 22 years old, beating Tracey Shenton for the Open Toulouse Central in France. She also lost to Tracey Shenton in the same year at the Isostar-Beverwijk tournament, Netherlands. At the Commonwealth Games in 1998 her partnership with Robyn Cooper brought them a silver medal in the Women's Doubles.

1999
Rachael had a good year in 1999 winning the Swiss Open, Germering Open and Indian Open beating Claire Waddell, Sabine Schoene and Claire Nitch respectively. She ended the year ranked No. 18 on the WISPA Tour.

2000–2001
Rachael finished 2000 by climbing 6 places in the ranking up to No. 12 in the world. She won two tournaments, Milo National Open beating the future world No. 1 Nicol David and successfully defended her Indian Open title by beating Salma Shabana, the sister of the male current world No. 1 Amr Shabana. She climbed 4 places in 2001 to No. 8 in the world. A family final finally first happened at a WISPA World Tour event in Malaysia in February 2001 when she beat sister Natalie for the Kuala Lumpur title. Later that year, she beat Nicol David for the DMC title.

2002–2003
The first half of 2002 did not go well for Rachael until she beat England's Tania Bailey for the Singapore Open. One month later she took the Credit Suisse Privilege Ladies Open, one of the finest squash tournaments in the world beating Natalie Grainger. Rachael and Natalie had won a women's doubles bronze medal at the 2002 Commonwealth Games. She climbed to No. 6 in the world by the end of the year. At the beginning of 2003, she claimed the Vassar College Class of 1932 beating Vicky Botwright. She reached two finals in Helioplis Open and Hurghada International in Egypt but lost both to former world No. 1 and retired player, Carol Owens. Arguably, 2003 British Open was the turning point for the 29-year-old, who pulled off a semi-final upset over the top seed, Carol Owens, then the World No. 1, before beating Cassie Jackman in the final to claim the title for the first time. She ended the year ranked No. 3 in the world.

2004
2004 was far the best year in Rachael's career. She has based herself in Cairo for a few years and it had proved to be a great place to hone her game. She may be slight in stature, but there is no doubting her tenaciousness, which saw her become world number one in August 2004. She started the year by claiming the Kuwait Open, the richest squash event in the world, by beating top seed Cassie Jackman. Later on, she beat Cassie Jackman again, then the World No. 1, for the Texas Open title. Three months later, she claimed the Hurghada International in Egypt which she lost last year beating the local favourite, Omneya Abdel Kawy. She reached the final of Brunei International but lost to Vanessa Atkinson. After a series of successful tournament wins, Rachael became the world No. 1 in August after dethroning Cassie Jackman. She continued her run by beating Cassie Jackman again for the Bahrain Classic Title. She retained her British Open title by beating Natalie Grainger. She lost again to Vanessa Atkinson in the final of the Qatar Classic Open. At the World Doubles Squash Championships, Rachael won the women's doubles title in 2004 (partnering Natalie), and the mixed doubles title in 2004 (partnering David Palmer). She ended the year ranked No. 1.

2005
She held on the top ranking at the beginning of the year. In April, she failed to defend her Texas Open title where she lost to Vanessa Atkinson. Later this month, she won her first Qatar Challenge beating Natalie Grainger. A month later, she successfully defended her title by defeating local favourite Omneya Abdel Kawy in the Hurghada International final in a 3–2 thriller. She took sweet revenge from Vanessa Atkinson beating her for the PMI Women's Open title. She lost her British Open title suffering a loss to Nicol David in semi-finals. She beat Omneya Abdel Kawy again for the Hedonism title in Jamaica. She held top spot for 16 months only losing it to Vanessa Atkinson in November. December 2005 saw her reach the final of the 2005 World Open in Hong Kong, only to be beaten by Malaysia's Nicol David. She finished the year at No. 2 ahead of Vanessa Atkinson.

2006
Nicol David and Vanessa Atkinson pushed her down to number three in the rankings at the start of 2006, but apart from tilting at WISPA Tour titles, she claimed Commonwealth Games Gold in Melbourne early in the year when she teamed up with sister Natalie to win the Women's Doubles title and another family final resulted in a silver medal for her with Natalie taking gold in the singles at the same Games. At the World Doubles Squash Championships, Rachael won the mixed doubles title 2006 (partnering Joe Kneipp). In May, she failed to defend her Hurghada International title losing 3–2 to local favourite and 2004 & 2005 finalist, Omneya Abdel Kawy. The next four tournaments saw her lose to Nicol David in the final of the Qatar Challenge, semi-finals of the CIMB Malaysian Open, final of the Hotel Equatorial Penang Open and final of the British Open. Finally, in October 2006 Rachael broke her run of being beaten in WISPA Tour finals when after a run of four defeats she triumphed at the Weymuller US Open beating Natalie Grainger. She suffered another two losses to Nicol David in the semi-finals of the CPS Hong Kong Open and the World Open.

2007
Rachael won five titles in 2007 – the Hurghada International and the Alexandria Sporting Club Open in Egypt, the Vassar College Class of 1932 Open in the United States, the British Open, and the 2006 World Open in Spain. In the British Open final, she came back from two games down to defeat Nicol David 7–9, 4–9, 9–3, 10–8, 9–1. In the World Open, she beat sister Natalie in the final 9–4, 10–8, 9–2.

2010
Due to an injury, Rachael missed some of the 2010 season. However, she stayed in the top five, only moving to slot number 6 at the end of 2011. She was also a part of the Australian team that won the gold medal at the 2010 Women's World Team Squash Championships.

2012

In September, Rachael dropped out of the WSA Top 10 for the first time in a decade.  She was also defeated in the first round by Omneya Abdel Kawy at a Malaysian Open.

2013

During this year Rachael was beaten at a semi-final finish by her younger sister Natalie. After that, she appeared in the Cleveland Classic's first round.  She lost in the CIMB KL Open first round, had a second-round finish at the Allam British Open, and won her 32nd title at the Victoria Open.

Personal life
Grinham came out as gay in May 2017, Grinham and her girlfriend, Jenny Duncalf were the first two squash players to publicly come out while still active in professional play.

Her younger sister Natalie Grinham is also a former professional squash player.

World Open

Finals: 2 (1 title, 1 runner-up)
Source:

Major World Series final appearances

British Open: 5 finals (4 titles, 1 runner-up)

Hong Kong Open: 1 final (0 title, 1 runner-up)

Qatar Classic: 3 finals (0 title, 3 runner-up)

Career statistics
Listed below.

WISPA Titles (27)
All Results for Rachael Grinham in WISPA World's Tour tournament

Note: (ret) = retired, min = minutes, h = hours

WISPA Tour Finals (Runner-Up) (14)

See also
 List of WISPA number 1 ranked players
 Official Women's Squash World Ranking

References

External links
 
 
 

1977 births
Living people
Australian female squash players
Commonwealth Games bronze medallists for Australia
Commonwealth Games gold medallists for Australia
Commonwealth Games medallists in squash
Commonwealth Games silver medallists for Australia
Competitors at the 2005 World Games
Competitors at the 2013 World Games
Sportspeople from Toowoomba
Squash players at the 1998 Commonwealth Games
Squash players at the 2002 Commonwealth Games
Squash players at the 2006 Commonwealth Games
Squash players at the 2014 Commonwealth Games
Squash players at the 2018 Commonwealth Games
World Games silver medalists
Australian Institute of Sport squash players
Australian LGBT sportspeople
LGBT squash players
Lesbian sportswomen
Medallists at the 1998 Commonwealth Games
Medallists at the 2002 Commonwealth Games
Medallists at the 2006 Commonwealth Games
Medallists at the 2014 Commonwealth Games
Medallists at the 2018 Commonwealth Games